Ermis Amyntaio Football Club is a Greek football club based in  Amyntaio, Florina (regional unit), Greece

Honours

Domestic

 Florina FCA Champions: 3
 1982–83, 1989–90, 2016–17, 2019–20
 Florina FCA Cup Winners: 3
 2000–01, 2014–15, 2017–18

References

Football clubs in Western Macedonia
Florina (regional unit)
Association football clubs established in 1926
1926 establishments in Greece
Gamma Ethniki clubs